Arch E. Beal (born February 23, 1955) is an American politician. He has served as a Republican member for the 12th district in the South Dakota House of Representatives since 2015.

Election history

References

1955 births
Living people
Educators from South Dakota
Democratic Party members of the South Dakota House of Representatives
21st-century American politicians